Shaw–Howard University is a Washington Metro station in Washington, D.C., on the Green Line and Yellow Line. The station primarily serves Washington's Shaw neighborhood, the home of Howard University.

The station is located within the neighborhood of the same name in the Northwest quadrant of the city, on 7th Street between R and S Streets. It lies just outside the defined boundaries of the Shaw Historic District, which encompasses much the area to the southwest.

Transit-oriented development
Like other stations along the stretch of the Green and Yellow Lines between Gallery Place and Fort Totten, Shaw has been revitalized by transit-oriented development, increasing economic development, residential density, and—controversially—accelerating the pace of gentrification.

Among other projects, Progression Place and CityMarket at O catalyzed development in the area in the early 2010s.

CityMarket at O, located between 7th, 9th, O, and P Streets NW, renovated the long-neglected O Street Market and added  of retail and 629 residential units.

History
Part of the original Metro plan, the station was initially referred to simply as "Shaw". It opened on May 11, 1991, as part of a northward extension of the Green Line from Gallery Place–Chinatown to U Street. The central route under 7th Street, below which the station sits, was added in 1967 primarily to serve the "inner city". The downtown segment of the line was originally projected to open in September 1977, but the first Green Line stations did not open until 1991. While a cut-and-fill tunnel for the Green Line was built under 7th Street and U Street, maintaining vehicle traffic and pedestrian access on those streets was difficult. The result was the loss of the traditional retail businesses along the route.

Station layout
Like most underground Metro stations, Shaw–Howard University is an island-platformed station lying directly below street level. There are two entrances, one to the north at the corner of 7th and S Streets and the other to the south on R Street between 7th and 8th Streets.

References

External links

 The Schumin Web Transit Center: Shaw–Howard Univ Station
 S Street entrance from Google Maps Street View
 R Street entrance from Google Maps Street View

Stations on the Green Line (Washington Metro)
Washington Metro stations in Washington, D.C.
Stations on the Yellow Line (Washington Metro)
Railway stations in Washington, D.C., at university and college campuses
Railway stations in the United States opened in 1991
1991 establishments in Washington, D.C.
Railway stations located underground in Washington, D.C.
Shaw (Washington, D.C.)